Rail transport in Cameroon is primarily operated by Camrail, a subsidiary of Bolloré Africa Logistics.

History 
In January 2022, it was announced that container shipping company MSC would take over Bolloré Africa Logistics, the parent company of Camrail. It is uncertain whether MSC, which has an annual turnover of around €30 billion, will maintain passenger transport on Cameroon's railways or prioritise the movement of its own containers. The development contrasts with the railways of neighbouring Nigeria, where passenger transport is making a profit and freight transport is in decline.

Infrastructure 

Separate from the metre gauge mainlines were narrow gauge plantation railways, especially in the Tiko area. These served cocoa and sugar plantations.

Possible extensions 
There are plans for an iron ore railway, which however might be isolated from existing railways. The distance from the mine to the nearest likely port is about 500 km. A connection to the nearest Camrail line at Mbalmayo on the Nyong River would be 350 km long. Because of the heavy tonnages to be carried, this railway is to be  (standard gauge). The railway would run from mines near Mbalam to a new 
port near Kribi. The expected traffic is 35 million tonnes per year for 25 years.

Extensions of the rail network to Maroua and Yokadouma to promote the forestry industry have also been recommended.

In December 2010, it was reported that a South Korean consortium planned to build new railways in Cameroon.

Adjacent countries
There are no links yet to railways in adjoining countries. The nearest the Nigerian railway system approaches Cameroon is Maiduguri over 100 km from the northern Cameroon border. The Gabon rail system (1,435 mm 4ft 8.5in) and Congolese rail systems  gauge do not run near to the Cameroonian border.

In 2011 funding for construction of a standard gauge railway line in Chad was obtained; the construction would include a line to Moundou and Koutéré near the Cameroon border, as well as a link to Nyala on the border with Sudan.

Rolling stock

Standards
 Brakes: Westinghouse Air
 Couplings: SA3

See also
 Railway stations in Cameroon

References

External links

 
Metre gauge railways in Cameroon